Chusaris is a genus of moths of the family Erebidae. It was erected by Francis Walker in 1859.

Description
Palpi long and porrect (extending forward), where the second joint fringed with scales above. Third joint slender and naked. Thorax smooth. Abdomen with a tuft on basal segment. Legs slender and naked. Forewings long and narrow with depressed and acute apex. Slight raised tufts found at middle and end of cell. Forewings with veins 6 and 7 arise from angle of cell and veins 8 to 10 stalked. Hindwings with veins 3 and 4 stalked and vein 5 from middle of discocellulars. Veins 6 and 7 stalked.

Species
Chusaris albilineata Holloway, 2008
Chusaris albipunctalis Rothschild, 1915
Chusaris bisinuata Hampson, 1898
Chusaris compripalpis Strand, 1920
Chusaris dinawa Bethune-Baker, 1908
Chusaris dubiosa Strand, 1919
Chusaris figurata (Moore, [1885])
Chusaris griseisigna Holloway, 2008
Chusaris idaeoides (Hampson, 1891)
Chusaris indigna (Wileman & West, 1930)
Chusaris indistincta (Rothschild, 1920)
Chusaris maculalis Walker, [1866]
Chusaris meterythrina Hampson, 1898
Chusaris microlepidopteronis (Strand, 1920)
Chusaris mulumaculata Holloway, 2008
Chusaris nigrisigna Hampson, 1902
Chusaris nigromaculata (Wileman, 1915)
Chusaris obliquisignata Holloway, 2008
Chusaris olearia Bethune-Baker, 1908
Chusaris opisthospila Turner, 1909
Chusaris bifasciata Holloway, 2008
Chusaris paucimaculata (Hampson, 1893)
Chusaris puncticilia (Hampson, 1891)
Chusaris purpurisigna Holloway, 2008
Chusaris renalis (Moore, 1882)
Chusaris retatalis Walker, [1859]
Chusaris retataloides Holloway, 2008
Chusaris rhynchinodes Strand, 1915
Chusaris roseolactea (Rothschild, 1915
Chusaris setocircularis Holloway, 2008
Chusaris signicosta (Walker, [1863])
Chusaris sordida (Wileman & South, 1917)
Chusaris venata Warren, 1914
Chusaris violisigna Holloway, 2008

References

Calpinae